Arshusha II was the Mihranid  (margrave) of Gugark in the mid 5th-century. He died in 470 and was succeeded by his son Varsken.

References

Sources 
 
 

470 deaths
Year of birth unknown
5th-century Iranian people
Mihranids